Morris E. Muhleman (1915–1998) was a politician in Rock Island County, Illinois, United States, for most of his life.  He was an Illinois State Senator, sheriff of Rock Island County, and mayor of the city of Rock Island.

Born June 1, 1915, he was raised in the City of Rock Island where he attended school and graduated from Rock Island High School in 1933. He married Winifred McClean on October 7, 1936. Prior to his election to public office Muhleman served as a bookkeeper, salesman, was manager and co-owner of a farm implement store.

Morrie Muhleman was an active member of the local Republican Party for years and in 1950 Muhleman was elected Sheriff of Rock Island County. He served in that office until November 1954 when he was elected to the Illinois State Senate. In the State Senate he was Vice-Chairman of the Senate Highways and Traffic Regulations Committee and also served on the Industrial Affairs Committee, Municipalities Committee, Pensions and Personnel Committee, and the Revenue Committee.

Muhleman was defeated in a surprise upset in 1958 by political veteran and former Illinois State Treasurer, Ora Smith.

In late 1960 Muhleman declared his candidacy for Mayor of Rock Island, Illinois. He won the February Primary and went on to victory in a tight Mayoral election the following April. Muhleman served as Mayor for one term before retiring in 1965. Muhleman's term as Mayor was marked by great cooperation between the city, business, and civic interests.

He remained semi-active in the community as a member of the Masonic Order, the Methodist Church, Kiwanis Club, Chamber of Commerce director, and a member of the local Boy Scout council. Past Fair Association President, and on the Executive Board of the Illinois Sheriff's Association as well as manager of the Rock Island Centennial Bridge from 1965 to 1980.  He was the owner of an insurance company in Rock Island known as the M. E. Muhleman Agency.

Muhleman died November 11, 1998 at the age of 83.

Electoral history
November 1950 election - Sheriff
R. Morris E. Muhleman-   21,860 54%
D. Howard Gregg-         18,492 46%
November 1954 election - State Senate
R. Morris E. Muhleman-   28,237 52%
D. Samuel Arndt-         26,292 48%
November 1958 election - State Senate
D. Ora Smith-            23,174 50%
R. Morris E. Muhleman-   22,736 50%
April 1965 election - Mayor of Rock Island
NP. Morris E. Muhleman-   6,146 53%
NP. Stanley Erikson-      5,446 47%

References

Mayors of places in Illinois
Politicians from Rock Island, Illinois
Businesspeople from Illinois
1915 births
1998 deaths
Illinois sheriffs
Republican Party Illinois state senators
20th-century American businesspeople
20th-century American politicians